The Wharemauku Stream is a stream on the Kapiti Coast of New Zealand's North Island. Its headwaters are in the Maungakotukutuku valley, and it flows through Paraparaumu and Raumati Beach before reaching the Tasman Sea on the northern side of Raumati Marine Gardens. From its headwaters to the sea, it passes through Kapiti Golf Course, Kaitawa Reserve, under the North Island Main Trunk railway and the former State Highway 1, Coastlands shopping centre, part of Paraparaumu Airport, and Weka Park.

References
"Wharemauku Wetlands" Kapiti Independent News. November 12, 2014

External links
Friends of Wharemauku Stream

Rivers of the Wellington Region
Rivers of New Zealand